OpenShot Video Editor is a free and open-source video editor for Windows, macOS, Linux, and ChromeOS. The project started in August 2008 by Jonathan Thomas, with the objective of providing a stable, free, and friendly to use video editor.

The program supports Windows, macOS, and Linux ever since version 2.1.0 (released in 2016). OpenShot added support for ChromeOS in version 2.6.0 (released in 2021). There is an unofficial portable version beginning in 2020.

OpenShot is written in Python, PyQt5, C++ and offers a Python API. OpenShot's core video editing functionality is implemented in a C++ library, libopenshot. The core audio editing is based on the JUCE library.

Video formats and codecs supported

OpenShot supports commonly used video compression formats that are supported by FFmpeg, including WebM (VP9), AVCHD (libx264), HEVC (libx265), and audio codecs such as mp3 (libmp3lame) and aac (libfaac). The program can render MPEG4, ogv, Blu-ray, and DVD video, and Full HD videos for uploading to Internet video web sites.

Features

 Cross-platform video editing software (Linux, macOS, Windows and ChromeOS).
Support for many video, audio, and image formats using the FFmpeg library. For a full list of supported formats, see the FFmpeg project.
Powerful curve-based Key frame animations. The key frames interpolation mode can be quadratic bezier curves, linear, or constant, which determines how the animated values are calculated.
Desktop integration (drag and drop support, native file browsers, window borders).
Unlimited tracks / layers Tracks are used to layer images, videos, and audio in a project. Any transparency will show through the layer below it. Tracks can also be moved up, down, or locked.
Clip resizing, scaling, trimming, snapping, rotation, cutting, alpha, and adjusting X,Y location. 
Video transitions with real-time previews. The quickness and sharpness of the transitions can also be adjusted using keyframes (if needed). Overlapping two clips will create a new transition automatically.
Compositing, image overlays, watermarks When arranging clips in a video project, images on the higher tracks/layers will be displayed on top, and the lower tracks will be displayed behind them. Much like a stack of paper, items on top cover up items below them. And if you cut any holes out (i.e. transparency) the lower images will show though.
Title templates, title creation, sub-titles.
3D animated titles (and effects) using Blender.
Advanced Timeline, with features including: Drag & drop, scrolling, alignment, panning, zooming, slicing, preset animation and settings, etc.
Frame accuracy (step through each frame of video) with keyboard support.
Time-mapping and speed changes on clips (slow/fast, forward/backward, etc...).
Audio mixing and editing features, such as displaying waveforms on the timeline, or even rendering the waveform as part of your video. You can also split the audio from your video clip, and adjust each audio channel individually.
Digital video effects, including brightness, gamma, hue, greyscale, chroma key (bluescreen / greenscreen).

Reviews
 A 2010 review of version 1.0 found it to be of alpha quality and not suited for productive use by the general public.
 In 2011, TechRadar recognized OpenShot Video Editor as the Best Linux Application of 2011.
 On March 31, 2017, a review by Bryan Lunduke on Network World lauded Openshot 2.3 for "its new transformation tool and title editor—as well as its smooth performance". Lunduke also positively mentioned the Linux distribution-agnostic packaging under usage of AppImage.
 In 2018, ReShift awarded OpenShot a Tech Award in the Video-Editing category. The Tech Awards are a shared initiative of The Netherlands biggest and most influential techmedia: Computer!Totaal, PCM, Zoom.nl, Computer Idee, BesteProduct.nl, Techpanel, Power Unlimited, Insidegamer.nl and Gamer.nl.
 TechRadar's Oct 2020 review gave it 2 out of 5 stars, suggested the program was stable but "some features don’t work making editing frustrating".

See also

 Comparison of video editing software
 List of video editing software
 Shotcut (open source video editor)

References

External links
 
 

Film and video technology
Free software programmed in Python
Free and open-source video-editing software
Multimedia software
Software that uses PyGObject
Video editing software for Windows
Video editing software for Linux
Video editing software that uses GTK